The 1993 Laurence Olivier Awards were held in 1993 in London celebrating excellence in West End theatre by the Society of London Theatre.

Winners and nominees
Details of winners (in bold) and nominees, in each award category, per the Society of London Theatre.

{| class=wikitable width="100%"
|-
! width="50%" | Play of the Year
! width="50%" | Best New Musical
|-
| valign="top" |
 Six Degrees of Separation by John Guare – Royal Court / Comedy
 Someone Who'll Watch Over Me by Frank McGuinness – Vaudeville
 The Gift of the Gorgon by Peter Shaffer – RSC at the Barbican Pit / Wyndham's
 The Street of Crocodiles by Bruno Schulz, adapted by Simon McBurney and Mark Wheathy – National Theatre Cottesloe
| valign="top" |
 Crazy for You – Prince Edward
 Assassins – Donmar Warehouse
 Grand Hotel – Dominion
 Kiss of the Spider Woman – Shaftesbury
|-
! style="width="50%" | Best Revival of a Play or Comedy
! style="width="50%" | Best Musical Revival
|-
| valign="top" |
 An Inspector Calls – National Theatre Lyttelton
 Heartbreak House – Theatre Royal Haymarket
 Henry IV – RSC at the Barbican
 No Man's Land – Comedy
| valign="top" |
 Carousel – National Theatre Lyttelton
 Annie Get Your Gun – Prince of Wales
 Lady, Be Good – Regent's Park Open Air
|-
! style="width="50%" | Best Comedy
! style="width="50%" | Best Entertainment
|-
| valign="top" |
 The Rise and Fall of Little Voice by Jim Cartwright – National Theatre Cottesloe / Aldwych
 Lost in Yonkers by Neil Simon – Strand
 On the Piste by John Godber – Garrick
| valign="top" |
 Travels with My Aunt – Wyndham's / Whitehall
 Ennio Marchetto – Whitehall
 The Blue Angel – Globe
 The Invisible Man – Vaudeville
|-
! style="width="50%" | Best Actor
! style="width="50%" | Best Actress
|-
| valign="top" |
 Robert Stephens as Sir John Falstaff in Henry IV – RSC at the Barbican
 Kenneth Cranham as Inspector Goole in An Inspector Calls – National Theatre Lyttelton
 Paul Eddington as Spooner in No Man's Land – Comedy
 Paul Scofield as Captain Shotover in Heartbreak House – Theatre Royal Haymarket
| valign="top" |
 Alison Steadman as Mari in The Rise and Fall of Little Voice – National Theatre Cottesloe / Aldwych
 Stockard Channing as Ouisa Kittredge in Six Degrees of Separation – Royal Court / Comedy
 Judi Dench as Helen Damson in The Gift of the Gorgon – RSC at the Barbican Pit / Wyndham's
 Jane Horrocks as Little Voice in The Rise and Fall of Little Voice – National Theatre Cottesloe / Aldwych
|-
! style="width="50%" | Best Actor in a Musical
! style="width="50%" | Best Actress in a Musical
|-
| valign="top" |
 Henry Goodman as Charles J. Guiteau in Assassins – Donmar Warehouse
 Brent Carver as Luis Alberto Molina in Kiss of the Spider Woman – Shaftesbury
 Michael Hayden as Billy Bigelow in Carousel – National Theatre Lyttelton
 Kirby Ward as Bobby Child in Crazy for You – Prince Edward
| valign="top" |
 Joanna Riding as Julie Jordan in Carousel – National Theatre Lyttelton
 Kim Criswell as Annie Oakley in Annie Get Your Gun – Prince of Wales
 Ruthie Henshall as Polly Baker in Crazy for You – Prince Edward
 Kelly Hunter as Lola Lola in The Blue Angel – Globe
|-
! colspan=1| Best Comedy Performance
|-
|
 Simon Cadell as Henry Pulling in Travels with My Aunt – Wyndham's / Whitehall
 Sara Crowe as Sorel Bliss in Hay Fever – Albery
 Guy Henry as Ananias in The Alchemist – RSC at the Barbican
 Robert Lindsay as Cyrano de Bergerac in Cyrano de Bergerac – Theatre Royal Haymarket
|-
! style="width="50%" | Best Actor in a Supporting Role
! style="width="50%" | Best Actress in a Supporting Role
|-
| valign="top" |
 Julian Glover as King Henry IV in Henry IV – RSC at the Barbican
 Robin Bailey as Sir William Gower in Trelawny of the Wells – National Theatre Olivier
 David Bradley as Justice Robert Shallow in Henry IV: Part 2 – RSC at the Barbican
 Martin Shaw as Lord Arthur Goring in An Ideal Husband – Globe	
| valign="top" |
 Barbara Leigh-Hunt as Sybil Birling in An Inspector Calls – National Theatre Lyttelton
 Annette Badland as Sadie in The Rise and Fall of Little Voice – National Theatre Cottesloe / Aldwych
 Elizabeth Bradley as Florence Boothroyd in Billy Liar – National Theatre Cottesloe
 Rosemary Harris as Grandma Kurnitz in Lost in Yonkers – Strand
|-
! colspan=1| Best Supporting Performance in a Musical
|-
|
 Janie Dee as Carrie Pipperidge in Carousel – National Theatre Lyttelton
 Ian Bartholomew as Wilf in Radio Times – Queen's
 Chris Langham as Bella Zangler in Crazy for You – Prince Edward
 Clive Rowe as Enoch Snow in Carousel – National Theatre Lyttelton
|-
! style="width="50%" | Best Director of a Play
! style="width="50%" | Best Director of a Musical
|-
| valign="top" |
 Stephen Daldry for An Inspector Calls – National Theatre Lyttelton
 Simon McBurney for The Street of Crocodiles – National Theatre Cottesloe
 Sam Mendes for The Rise and Fall of Little Voice – National Theatre Cottesloe / Aldwych
 Adrian Noble for Henry IV – RSC at the Barbican
| valign="top" |
 Nicholas Hytner for Carousel – National Theatre Lyttelton
 Sam Mendes for Assassins – Donmar Warehouse
 Mike Ockrent for Crazy for You – Prince Edward
 Harold Prince for Kiss of the Spider Woman – Shaftesbury
|-
! colspan=1| Best Theatre Choreographer
|-
|
 Susan Stroman for Crazy for You – Prince Edward
 Kenneth MacMillan for Carousel – National Theatre Lyttelton
 Marcello Magni for The Street of Crocodiles – National Theatre Cottesloe
 Tommy Tune for Grand Hotel – Dominion
|-
! colspan=1| Best Set Designer
! colspan=1| Best Costume Designer
|-
| valign="top" |
 Ian MacNeil for An Inspector Calls – National Theatre Lyttelton
 Bob Crowley for Carousel – National Theatre Lyttelton, Henry IV – RSC at the Barbican and No Man's Land – Comedy
 Jerome Sirlin for Kiss of the Spider Woman – Shaftesbury
 Robin Wagner for Crazy for You – Prince Edward
| valign="top" |
 William Dudley for Heartbreak House – Theatre Royal Haymarket, Pygmalion – National Theatre Olivier and The Rise and Fall of Little Voice – National Theatre Cottesloe / Aldwych
 Bob Crowley for Carousel – National Theatre Lyttelton and Hamlet – RSC at the Barbican
 Anthony Powell for Hay Fever – Albery and Trelawny of the Wells – National Theatre Olivier
 Carl Toms for An Ideal Husband – Globe
|-
! colspan=1| Best Lighting Designer
|-
|
 Howell Binkley for Kiss of the Spider Woman – Shaftesbury
 Paule Constable for The Street of Crocodiles – National Theatre Cottesloe
 Rick Fisher for An Inspector Calls – National Theatre Lyttelton
 Jean Kalman for A Midsummer Night's Dream – National Theatre Olivier
|-
! style="width="50%" | Outstanding Achievement in Dance
! style="width="50%" | Best New Dance Production
|-
| valign="top" |
 Siobhan Davies for choreographing Winnsboro Cotton Mill Blues, The Royal Ballet – Royal Opera House
 David Bintley for choreographing Tombeaux, Rambert Dance Company – Royalty
 Lez Brotherston for set and costume designing the season, Northern Ballet Theatre – Royalty
 Joseph Cipolla in The Green Table, Birmingham Royal Ballet – Sadler's Wells
| valign="top" |
 The Judas Tree, The Royal Ballet – Royal Opera House
 Catalyst, The Australian Ballet – London Coliseum
 Donizetti Variations, Les Patineurs and Witchboy, London City Ballet – Sadler's Wells
 Winnsboro Cotton Mill Blues, Rambert Dance Company – Royalty
|-
! style="width="50%" | Outstanding Achievement in Opera
! style="width="50%" | Outstanding New Opera Production
|-
| valign="top" |
 Edward Downes for conducting Stiffelio and The Fiery Angel, The Royal Opera – Royal Opera House
 Bernard Haitink for conducting Die Frau ohne Schatten, The Royal Opera – Royal Opera House
 Philip Langridge in Death in Venice, The Royal Opera – Royal Opera House
 Júlia Várady in Der fliegende Holländer, The Royal Opera – Royal Opera House
| valign="top" |
 Stiffelio, The Royal Opera – Royal Opera House
 Death in Venice, The Royal Opera – Royal Opera House
 Der fliegende Holländer by The Royal Opera – Royal Opera House
 The Fiery Angel, The Royal Opera – Royal Opera House
|-
! colspan=1| Award for Outstanding Achievement 
|-
|
 Medea, No Man's Land, The Deep Blue Sea and The Rules of the Game for riding the crest of its own wave with great style and giving glamour a good name on the fringe – Almeida
 Kenneth Branagh for an ebullient performance (his best on the stage for years) in Hamlet – RSC at the Barbican
 Eddie Izzard an accomplished and original comedian, the bloke in a frock, who held audiences spellbound for two-and-a-half-hours in his West End debut – Ambassadors
 Robert Lepage for an astonishing solo trip on drugs, jazz and Jean Cocteau with a technologically refined use of film and acrobatics in Needles and Opium – National Theatre Cottesloe
 John Osborne for refusing to lie down and completing the circle begun by Look Back in Anger with the energetic update on Jimmy Porter with Déjà Vu – Comedy
 Billy Roche for his irresistible tapestry of slowly changing Irish life in the pool hall, the betting shop and the belfry in The Wexford Trilogy – Bush
|-
! colspan=1| Society Special Award
|-
|
 Kenneth MacMillan'|}

Productions with multiple nominations and awards
The following 25 productions, including one ballet and four operas, received multiple nominations:

 9: Carousel 7: Crazy for You 6: An Inspector Calls, Henry IV and The Rise and Fall of Little Voice 5: Kiss of the Spider Woman 4: The Street of Crocodiles 3: Assassins, Heartbreak House and No Man's Land 2: An Ideal Husband, Annie Get Your Gun, Death in Venice, Der fliegende Holländer, Grand Hotel, Hay Fever, Lost in Yonkers, Six Degrees of Separation, Stiffelio, The Blue Angel, The Fiery Angel, The Gift of the Gorgon, Travels with My Aunt, Trelawny of the Wells and Winnsboro Cotton Mill BluesThe following six productions received multiple awards:

 4: An Inspector Calls and Carousel 3: The Rise and Fall of Little Voice 2: Crazy for You, Henry IV and Travels with My Aunt''

See also
 47th Tony Awards

References

External links
 Previous Olivier Winners – 1993

Laurence Olivier Awards ceremonies
Laurence Olivier Awards, 1993
Laurence Olivier Awards
Laurence Olivier Awards